Balsac is a village in the Aveyron department in the Occitanie region of southern France.  It was merged into the new commune of Druelle Balsac on 1 January 2017.

The inhabitants of the commune are known as Balsacois or Balsacoises.

Geography
Balsac is located some 10 km north-west of Rodez and 8 km south-east of Saint-Christophe-Vallon, immediately west of Rodez–Marcillac Airport. Access to the commune is by the D598 which branches off the D57 west of the commune and passes through the village continuing to join the D840 south-east of the commune. The D626 goes north-east from the village to join the D840. The commune is entirely farmland.

The Ruisseau des Parranies and its tributary the Ruisseau du Sauvage rise in the south of the commune and flow west then north-west, forming part of the western border of the commune, to join the Ruisseau de l'Ady west of the commune.

Neighbouring communes and villages

Administration

List of Successive Mayors

Demography
In 2012 the commune had 615 inhabitants.

Sites and monuments
There are two sites which are registered as historical monuments:
The Ruins of the old Priory of Sauvage (13th century)
The Chateau of Balsac (14th - 16th centuries) belonged to a number of noble families, including the Glandières and the Faramonds, until 1780 when it came into the possession of the Grailhe family of Rodez.  During the periods that followed, the chateau was owned by a series of illustrious personages.  The Chateau currently operates as a guest house and table d'hote.
The Parish Church contains three items that are registered as historical objects:
A Statue: Virgin and child (15th century)
A Statue: Saint Antoine (15th century)
A Statue: Saint Foy (15th century)

See also
Communes of the Aveyron department

References

Bibliography
Christian-Pierre Bedel, preface by José Monestier, Marcilhac, Balsac, Claravals, Moret, Muret, Nòuviala, Prunas, Salas-Comtals, Sent-Cristòfa, Valadin / Christian-Pierre Bedel e los estatjants del canton de Marcilhac, Rodez, Mission départementale de la culture, 2001, Al canton collection, 392 pages, ill., cov. ill.; 28 cm, ISSN 1151-8375, BnF 38803935q

External links
Balsac on the old National Geographic Institute website 
Balsac on Géoportail, National Geographic Institute (IGN) website 
Balſac on the 1750 Cassini Map

Former communes of Aveyron
Populated places disestablished in 2017